The following is a list of major roads in Montreal, Quebec, Canada.

North-South
Armand-Bombardier Boulevard, :fr:Boulevard Armand-Bombardier
Atateken Street, :fr:Rue Atateken
Atwater Avenue
Beaudry Street, :fr:Rue Beaudry
Berri Street
Bishop Street
Cavendish Boulevard, :fr:Boulevard Cavendish
Champlain Street
Clark Street
Côte-des-Neiges Road
Crescent Street
D'Iberville Street, :fr:Rue D'Iberville
Décarie Boulevard
De L'Acadie Boulevard, :fr:Boulevard de l'Acadie
De L'Assomption Boulevard, :fr:Boulevard de l'Assomption
De Lorimier Avenue, :fr:Avenue De Lorimier
Drummond Street
Guy Street
Honoré Beaugrand Street
Lacordaire Boulevard, :fr:Boulevard Lacordaire
Langelier Boulevard, :fr:Boulevard Langelier
Louis-Hippolyte-Lafontaine Boulevard, :fr:Boulevard Louis-Hippolyte-Lafontaine
MacKay Street
Mansfield Street  
McGill College Avenue
McGill Street
Metcalfe Street
Montcalm Street
Mountain Street
Panet Street
Papineau Avenue
Park Avenue
Peel Street
Pie-IX Boulevard
Plessis Street
Saint Andre Street
Saint Denis Street
Saint Hubert Street
Saint-Michel Boulevard
Saint Timothee Street
Saint Urbain Street
Sanguinet Street
Stanley Street
Des Sources Boulevard, :fr:Boulevard des Sources
University Street
Victoria Avenue, :fr:Avenue Victoria (Montréal)
Visitation Street
Wolfe Street

East-West
Beaubien Street
Bélanger Street, :fr:Rue Bélanger
Côte-Vertu Boulevard, :fr:Boulevard de la Côte-Vertu 
Crémazie Boulevard
Côte-de-Liesse Road 
Côte-Sainte-Catherine Road, :fr:Chemin de la Côte-Sainte-Catherine
Côte-St-Luc Road
The Boulevard
De la Commune Street, :fr:Rue de la Commune (Montréal)
De la Gauchetière Street
De la Vérendrye Boulevard, :fr:Boulevard de La Vérendrye
De Maisonneuve Boulevard
Doctor Penfield Avenue
Duluth Avenue, :fr:Avenue Duluth
Édouard-Montpetit Boulevard
Fleury Street
Gouin Boulevard
Henri Bourassa Boulevard
Hochelaga Street, :fr:Rue Hochelaga
Hymus Boulevard, :fr:Boulevard Hymus
Jarry Street
Jean Talon Street
Lakeshore Road, :fr:Chemin du Bord-du-Lac
Laurier Avenue
Masson Street
Monkland Avenue
Mount Royal Avenue
Newman Boulevard, :fr:Boulevard Newman
Notre-Dame Street
Ontario Street
President Kennedy Avenue
Pine Avenue
Prince Arthur Street, :fr:Rue Prince-Arthur
Queen Mary Road
Rachel Street, :fr:Rue Rachel
René Lévesque Boulevard
Saint Antoine Street
Saint Catherine Street
Saint Jacques Street
Saint Joseph Boulevard
Saint Patrick Street
Rue Saint-Paul
Saint Zotique Street, :fr:Rue Saint-Zotique
Sauvé Street, :fr:Rue Sauvé
Sherbrooke Street
Somerled Avenue
Van Horne Avenue, :fr:Avenue Van Horne
Verdun Street, :fr:Rue de Verdun (Montréal)
Victoria Avenue, :fr:Victoria Avenue (Montreal)
Viger Avenue, :fr:Avenue Viger
Wellington Street

Expressways
 10 (Bonaventure Expressway)
13 (Chomedey Expressway)
15 (Laurentides Expressway)
19 (Papineau Expressway)
20
25 (Louis-H-Lafontaine Expressway) 
40 (Metropolitan Expressway)
520 (Côte-de-liesse Expressway)

Routes
Route 112 (Bridge & Mountain)
Route 117 (Laurentian & Marcel Laurin)
Route 125 (Pie-IX)
Route 136 (Ville-Marie Expressway) (former A-720)
Route 138 (Sherbrooke Street)
Route 335 (Saint Denis)

See also
List of bridges in Montreal
List of crossings of the Rivière des Prairies
Transportation in Montreal

External links
MontrealRoads.com by Steve Anderson (English)

Montreal
 Roads
Roads